Saint Luke Painting the Crucifixion is an oil on canvas painting by Francisco de Zurbarán, executed , also known as Crucifixion with Saint Luke or The Crucified Christ with a Painter. It is now in the Prado Museum. The figure of Saint Luke is thought to be a self-portrait of the artist.

References

Bibliography
  Antonio Fernández Paradas, Escultura Barroca Española. Nuevas lecturas desde los Siglos de Oro a la sociedas del conocimento - Escultura Barroca Andaluza - Volumen II, ExLibric, 2016.

Zurbaran
Paintings depicting the Crucifixion of Jesus
Paintings by Francisco de Zurbarán in the Museo del Prado
1650 paintings
Paintings about painting